The siege of Ancona was a battle in the Neapolitan War. It took place beginning on 5 May 1815 and persisted until 30 May 1815. The battle took place mere days after the Battle of Tolentino on 3 May 1815. 

The siege of Ancona was one of the last battles in Italy during the Neapolitan War. The city of Ancona was the last major Italian city to surrender. It was fought between Napoleon's forces in Ancona, Italy and the Anglo-Austrian alliance during the One Hundred Days’ campaign. The Anglo-Austrian alliance eventually defeated Napoleon's forces, thus helping expel the French from Eastern Italy. It also contributed to the elimination of the Bonaparte monarchy proposed by Murat and led to the establishment of the Papal state.

Battle 
An Austrian force commanded by Austrian Major General Menrad Freiherr von Geppert besieged Ancona on 5 May 1815. The Anglo-Austrian force was 2,300 men strong. Ancona was defended by a garrison of Napoleon's troops, which was composed of 1,500 men. This garrison had been part of Michele Carrascosa's brigade, which fought in the Battle of Tolentino. The French lost 500 men to the Anglo-Austrian bombardment before they ultimately surrendered on 30 May.

Ramifications 
The siege of Ancona cemented the loss of Napoleon's forces in Italy. Ancona was the last major Italian city to surrender to the Austrians, and the battle came shortly before the downfall of Napoleon at the Battle of Waterloo.

As a result of the expulsion of the French, there arose a power vacuum in Italy. The Italians adamantly refused to support anyone who came in the name of Napoleon. Unification of Italy was Murat's ideal. Murat was an Italian prince who supported Napoleon's bid for power in Italy. As a result of anti-Napoleon sentiment, Murat's attempt to install a Bonaparte monarchy even after the defeat of Napoleon failed to gain traction. His attempt to establish a monarchy in Italy was rejected, and the Bonaparte royalty was completely deposed by the English in Naples at the same time as the end of the siege of Ancona; 30 May 1815.  Murat had earlier been defeated in battle by the Austrians on 3 May 1815 at Tolentino. Unfortunately, this meant that the constitution he proposed before his defeat never took hold. However, his ideals of an independent Italy played a role in the Risorgimento, decades later.

The elimination of the Bourbon influence in Italy after the siege of Ancona paved the way for the Papal state that took power in 1814. The Papal state supported a policy of conservatism in Italy, upholding Austrian influence and opposing revolution and unification. Due to this conservative policy, the Papal state hindered the unification of Italy for many years. The administration of the Papal state was in place until the overthrow of Metternich in 1848.

Citations

References

External links 
 Tolentino 815, the web site of the society which re-enacts and studies the battle.
 Battle of Tolentino at Napoleon Guide.

Conflicts in 1815
Battles of the Neapolitan War
Sieges involving Austria
Sieges involving the United Kingdom
1815 in Italy
Sieges involving the Kingdom of Naples
May 1815 events